Events in the year 2004 in Burkina Faso.

Incumbents 

 President: Blaise Compaoré
 Prime Minister: Paramanga Ernest Yonli

Events 

 April 6 – A military tribunal tries 13 people accused of conspiring to overthrow President Compaore the previous year.

Deaths

References 

 
2000s in Burkina Faso
Years of the 21st century in Burkina Faso
Burkina Faso
Burkina Faso